Toribio or Toribío may refer to:

Places
 Toribío, Cauca, a town in Cauca Department, Colombia
 Santo Toribio de Liébana, a Roman Catholic monastery in Cantabria, Spain
 Santo Toribio District, a district in the Ancash Region of Peru
 Toribio Casanova District, a district in Cutervo, Peru

People

Saints
 Toribio Romo González (1900-1928), a Mexican saint
 Turibius of Mongrovejo (1538–1606), Archbishop of Lima, Peru, from 1579 to 1606

Athletes
 Daniel Toribio (born 5 October 1988), a Spanish footballer
 Simeon Toribio (September 3, 1905 – June 5, 1969), Olympic athlete from the Philippines
 Manuel Ortiz Toribio (born August 22, 1984), Spanish footballer

Other people
 Toribio de Benavente Motolinia (1482-1568), a Franciscan missionary in Mexico
 Toribio Rodríguez de Mendoza (1750-1825), a Peruvian academic
 Celines Toribio, a Spanish actress
 René Toribio (1912-1990), a Guadeloupean politician
 Toribio Terán, president of Nicaragua, January to March 1849

See also
 Turibius (disambiguation)